Barnihar is a village in West Champaran district in the Indian state of Bihar.

Demographics
 India census, Barnihar had a population of 2085 in 358 households. Males constitute 52% of the population and females 47%. Barnihar has an average literacy rate of 38.9%, lower than the national average of 74%: male literacy is 61.9%, and female literacy is 38%. In Barnihar, 22.73% of the population is under 6 years of age.

References

Villages in West Champaran district